"Big Girls" is a song written by Lin Buckfield and recorded by the Australian band Electric Pandas. It was released in May 1984 as the band's debut single and it peaked at number 18 on the Australian Kent Music Report.

Track listing
 7" Single (RRSP 732)
 Side A "Big Girls" - 3:09
 Side B "T.V. Dogs" - 2:11

Charts

References 

1984 songs
1984 debut singles